Aleksandr Radchenko (1943 – 13 November 2014) was an ethnic Ukrainian politician and human rights activist from Transnistria. A former Soviet military officer, he was the editor of a small opposition newspaper in Tiraspol called Chelovek i ego prava (Man and His Rights). Most of his articles deal with human rights issues.

In 1994 Radchenko founded the now-defunct political party Power to the People (Vlast narodu). During the February 2001 elections to the Republic of Moldova Parliament his party advocated participation of Transnistrians at those elections and campaigned for the Moldova Communist Party. He was accused by the Transnistrian Minister of Justice of crimes against the state as he was advocating the restoration of Moldova's territorial integrity and, therefore, the liquidation of the separate Transnistrian state. His party was twice banned for short periods.

Alexander Radchenko participated in the 9 December 2001 Transnistrian presidential election, running against the incumbent Igor Smirnov and Tom Zenovich. Of the three candidates, he came last with just under five percent of the votes.

Between 2000 and 2005 he was a member of parliament but he failed to win re-election on 11 December 2005.

In January 2007 Radchenko founded the Social Democratic Party of Pridnestrovie, the only political party in Transnistria which is in favor of conditional unification with Moldova.

He died on 13 November 2014.

See also
Nikolai Buchatskii

References

1943 births
2014 deaths
Transnistrian politicians
Transnistrian activists